The Frith is a small univallate Iron Age hillfort to the north of Silchester, Calleva Atrebatum, Roman town in the English county of Hampshire. A ditch is also traceable for the length of the bank, although at varying states.

The area to the north and northwest is partially wooded. A local footpath crosses the site east to west. Close by to the south lies a Roman road heading into Calleva Atrebatum. Also nearby,  to the west, lies a further smaller unidentified enclosure.

Location
The site is within Benyon's Inclosure to the North of Silchester, part of Mortimer West End Civil Parish, in the county of Hampshire

References



Hill forts in Hampshire